Emre Bal (born 5 January 1997) is a Turkish footballer who plays as a forward for Hoofdklasse club DHSC. He also holds Dutch citizenship.

Club career
He made his professional debut in the Eerste Divisie for Almere City FC on 22 August 2016 in a game against FC Emmen.

Since 2018, Bal has played for lower-league Hoofdklasse club DHSC.

References

External links
 

1997 births
Footballers from Utrecht (city)
Dutch people of Turkish descent
Living people
Turkish footballers
Association football forwards
Almere City FC players
DHSC players
Eerste Divisie players
Derde Divisie players
Vierde Divisie players